"Take the Lead (Wanna Ride)" is a single by American hip hop group Bone Thugs-n-Harmony and Puerto Rican reggaeton duo Wisin & Yandel, released on March 21, 2006 by Republic Records and Universal. It features Fatman Scoop and Melissa Jiménez, and was released from the soundtrack to the 2006 film Take the Lead. The song was produced by Swizz Beatz, who also produced most of the songs on the soundtrack. The soundtrack contains the radio edit version, while the film features the alternate version with rapper Drag-On at the end.

Track listings and formats
US promo CD single
 "Take the Lead (Wanna Ride)" (radio edit)

US Promo 12-inch vinyl
 "Take the Lead (Wanna Ride)"
 "Take the Lead (Wanna Ride)" (instrumental)
 "Take the Lead (Wanna Ride)" (main version, featuring Drag-On)

Chart performance
Due to its lack of airplay, it could not chart on the United States Billboard Hot 100. However, it managed to chart at #44 on the U.S. Billboard Hot Latin Tracks chart.

Chart positions

Release history

References

2006 singles
Wisin & Yandel songs
Bone Thugs-n-Harmony songs
Song recordings produced by Swizz Beatz
Reggaeton songs
Songs written by Swizz Beatz
Songs written for films
Fatman Scoop songs
Spanglish songs
2006 songs
Songs written by Wisin
Songs written by Yandel
Songs written by Fatman Scoop
Songs written by Krayzie Bone
Songs written by Wish Bone